Calvert's Valley is a 1922 American silent drama film directed by John Francis Dillon and starring John Gilbert, Sylvia Breamer and Philo McCullough.

Cast
 John Gilbert as Page Emlyn 
 Sylvia Breamer as Hester Rymal
 Philo McCullough as James Calvert / Eugene Calvert
 Herschel Mayall as Judge Rymal
 Lule Warrenton as The Widow Crowcroft

References

Bibliography
 Solomon, Aubrey. The Fox Film Corporation, 1915-1935: A History and Filmography. McFarland, 2011.

External links
 

1922 films
1922 drama films
1920s English-language films
American silent feature films
Silent American drama films
American black-and-white films
Films directed by John Francis Dillon
Fox Film films
1920s American films